Juan O'Neylle (1765 – February 24, 1809) was a Spanish Field Marshal (Mariscal) of Spanish-Irish descent.  He is best known as one of the commanders during the Spanish defeat at the Battle of Tudela.

Military career 

When his father died in 1792, O'Neylle was an infantry battalion commander of the 3rd Regimento de la Princesa.  His first actions were in Roussillon and Catalonia in May 1808 where he distinguished himself and was put on the staff of José Rebolledo de Palafox y Melzi. O'Neylle marched with his troops from Valencia to Aragon where he was instrumental in lifting the French siege and driving away the forces of François Joseph Lefebvre who was forced to retire to Navarre.  Palafox entrusted O'Neylle together with the Marqués de Lazán to press the retreat of Lefebvre.  This bold attack forced the occupying French forces to abandon Tudela and O'Neylle was personally responsible for destroying a French column in the area around Nardués.  On November 23, 1808, the Spanish army of Andalucía regrouped and prepared to give battle under the command of Francisco Javier Castaños, 1st Duke of Bailén with Palafox as the second in command. This engagement was to become known as the disastrous Battle of Tudela. The French forces, under the command of Jean Lannes routed the Spanish army which was forced to retreat to Zaragoza.

Despite the Spanish defeat at Tudela, O'Neylle was raised to this rank of lieutenant colonel by Palafox for his actions.  He acted as Palafox's second in command in the successful Spanish defense at the First Siege of Zaragoza.

On December 21, 1808, O'Neylle was involved in the Battle of Arrabal where the Spanish forces from Murcia and Valencia successfully repelled repeated attacks from the division under the command of Honoré Théodore Maxime Gazan de la Peyrière, forcing them to retire.  He was further involved in pursuing the retreating French forces on the 25th of the same month.  The French had built a pontoon bridge from Almozara to the opposite bank of the Ebro in order to facilitate communication between Gazan's camp and that of the remaining French forces.  O'Neylle attacked the entrenched French position at the head of 4,000 men and was able to successfully drive them off.  Unfortunately for him however, he was not able to hold the pontoon bridge rendering the whole operation fruitless.

Death and legacy

In late January 1809, O'Neylle became gravely ill with Typhoid fever but was apparently able to recover.  According to the biography written by Brigadier Gen. M. Salas, the subsequent news of the Spanish capitulation to French forces in that same year caused him to die from a "broken heart".  Some sources maintain that he died from typhoid Fever.

Juan O'Neylle died on February 24, 1809.  He was buried in the Catedral-Basílica de Nuestra Señora del Pilar de Zaragoza.

References

Bibliography 
 
 Some of the information on this page has been translated from its Spanish equivalent.

Spanish generals
Spanish commanders of the Napoleonic Wars
Military leaders of the French Revolutionary Wars
Spanish people of Irish descent
1765 births
1809 deaths
Spanish army officers